Jim Pender may refer to:
Jim Pender (footballer, born 1877) (1877–1915), Australian rules footballer for Carlton
Jim Pender (footballer, born 1911) (1911–1985), Australian rules footballer for Geelong

See also
Sir James Pender, 1st Baronet, British businessman, yachtsman and politician
Jim Penders, baseball coach